Amirabad (also Romanized as Amīrābād) is a village in Gharbi Rural District, in the Central District of Ardabil County, Ardabil Province, Iran. At the 2006 census, its population was 38, in 7 families.

References 

Towns and villages in Ardabil County